Edward Saatchi (born 19 February 1985) is a British businessman and filmmaker. He is the chief executive officer (CEO) of artificial intelligence-powered virtual being company Fable. He was formerly a producer at Oculus Story Studio and the CEO and co-founder of political technology company, NationalField.

Early life and education
Edward Saatchi is the son of Maurice Saatchi and Josephine Hart. His father was an Iraqi Jew born in Baghdad while his mother was Irish. He was educated at London's Westminster School  and Wadham College in Oxford, where he took a double first in English Studies. He attended the Sorbonne for graduate studies in philosophy and economics, before leaving for the US to volunteer for Barack Obama's 2008 Presidential campaign.

Career
Saatchi was initially rejected in his efforts to join the Obama campaign because of his alien status, but eventually permitted to participate after personally presenting himself at a campaign office in Iowa.  During his tenure with the campaign, he met Aharon Wasserman and Justin Lewis. The three developed an "internal social network" to more easily keep track of campaign data and coordinate communications between managers, staff, and volunteers. The network was rapidly adopted across multiple branches of the campaign and eventually commercialised in its present form as NationalField.   He is the company's CEO. In 2011, Saatchi, along with his co-founders, was named in a Forbes's 30 Under 30 list.

In 2014, he was part of the founding team of Oculus Story Studio, the virtual-reality filmmaking division of Oculus VR.

In January 2018, Fable Studio, which Saatchi co-founded with Pete Billington, launched, with Wolves in the Walls as its premiere title. The property was based on the Neil Gaiman and Dave McKean children's book of the same name. In August 2019, Wolves in the Walls won a Primetime Emmy for outstanding innovation in interactive media.

Personal life
Saatchi told Forbes in 2014 that he practises Transcendental Meditation, rises before dawn, exercises daily and enjoys films and painting.

References

1985 births
Living people
Alumni of Wadham College, Oxford
Barack Obama 2008 presidential campaign
British chief executives
British computer scientists
British expatriates in the United States
British software engineers
English people of Iraqi-Jewish descent
English people of Irish descent
Edward
Sons of life peers